Bijon Setu is a bridge situated above Ballygunge Junction railway station connects EM Bypass through Kasba with Gariahat.

History

The bridge is named after a Bengali engineer Bijon Basu. 35 year old Basu was an executive engineer of Calcutta Improvement Trust. On 2 August 1974, while he was returning home from Santoshpur to Sealdah, a gang of robbers got on the train and looted passengers. Basu protested but the robbers stabbed him and threw him out from the running train beside Ballygunge railway station. The bridge was established in 1978.

1982 Massacre 
16 monks and one nun of a Hindu organization Ananda Marga religious sect were lynched and burnt alive near Bijon Setu in the morning of 30 April 1982. This incident was called as Bijon Setu massacre.

References

Bridges in Kolkata
Bridges completed in 1978
1978 establishments in West Bengal
20th-century architecture in India